Christopher John Glen (born 6 November 1950), known simply as Chris Glen, is a Scottish rock musician. He is best known for playing with The Sensational Alex Harvey Band from 1972 to 1978, and Michael Schenker Group from 1980 to 1984, 2008 to 2010, and 2016 to present. He currently performs with Michael Schenker Fest; featuring original MSG band members.

Early career and The Sensational Alex Harvey Band
Glen began his career as bassist for a band known as The Jade in 1969. That band changed their name to Mustard, which eventually was composed of Eddie Campbell (keyboards), Zal Cleminson (guitar), Chris Glen (bass, vocals), Gilson Lavis (drums) and Andi Mulvey (vocals). After changing their name to Tear Gas, Mulvey was replaced by David Batchelor, and Lavis was replaced by Richard Munro. This lineup recorded their first album Piggy Go Getter in 1970. Eventually another personnel change saw Campbell leave and Ted McKenna and his cousin Hugh McKenna take over for Munro and Batchelor (who went on to produce several SAHB albums). They recorded a second album Tear Gas in 1971.  Neither album sold well.

In 1972, fellow Scotsman Alex Harvey joined forces with Tear Gas and together they formed The Sensational Alex Harvey Band. They played with the lineup of Harvey, Cleminson, Glen and the McKennas until a personnel change in 1978 which saw Hugh McKenna replaced by Tommy Eyre. Harvey who had left briefly in 1977, left the band for good in 1979. The band disbanded after that, only to be reformed in the early 1990s.

With GMT and Ian Gillan 
Glen has performed with Brian Robertson (Thin Lizzy), Robin McAuley and Phil Taylor in a band called GMT (GLEN/MCAULEY/TAYLOR), and they recorded an album in 1985 titled Wargames. He also toured with Ian Gillan in 1990 for the Naked Thunder World Tour alongside fellow SAHB band member, Ted McKenna.

Reunion with The Sensational Alex Harvey Band 
In 1992, Glen teamed up with former SAHB members Zal Cleminson & Ted McKenna to form The Party Boys which featured guest vocalists such as FISH, Dan McCafferty, and Stevie Doherty with Stone The Crows keyboardist Ronnie Leahy.  This band lasted about 2 years before they decided to recruit SAHB keyboard player Hugh McKenna, and reform as SAHB, and also release a live album Live in Glasgow 93 featuring Stevie Doherty on vocals.  This line-up of SAHB disbanded in 1995, before reforming in 2002 for a tribute night to Frankie Miller at The Barrowlands in Glasgow with ex Nazareth guitarist Billy Rankin on vocals. After a year 'Mad' Max Maxwell replaced Rankin on vocals.

SAHB released a live album titled Zalvation, which was their first official release since Rock Drill with Alex Harvey in 1977, and an Autobiography called SAHBSTORY, written by former tour manager and author Martin Keilty.  The band performed numerous tours and festivals across the UK, Europe, and Australia before once again disbanding in 2008 after the departure of Zal Cleminson on guitar.  The band carried out a handful of shows that were pre-booked with  guitarist Julian Hutson Saxby but after that, they decided to move on to separate projects.

Recent activity 
Since 2008, Glen has been involved with his own band Chris Glen and the Outfit. He also re-joined the Michael Schenker Group (MSG) from 2008 to 2010 to promote the album, In the Midst of Beauty. That was Glen's first tour with MSG since he left in 1984. He also performed on two tracks on Michael Schenker's 2010 album Temple of Rock.

Glen and Ted McKenna worked with Australian guitarist Gwyn Ashton, and Newcastle an album called Prohibition in 200, as well as perform live with guitarist Paul Rose.

He is a member of the reformed 1970's band Cafe Jacques, three-piece project Votadini, and, in early 2013, he toured with former AC/DC drummer Chris Slade for the latter's 50th Anniversary in music tour called Chris Slade's Timeline.

In 2016, Chris and Ted McKenna rejoined Michael Schenker for Michael Schenker Fest - a Celebration of the musical career of the rock guitar legend. They recorded in Tokyo the live DVD and double CD package Tokyo International Forum Hall A and 2018 their first studio album Resurrection. Sadly Ted McKenna died on 19 January 2019, and was replaced by Bodo Schopf. The band recorded 2019 their follow up studio album Revelation.

Chris is still relatively active with his own band The Outfit performing shows in Glasgow and Edinburgh primarily.

Christmas concert 
Every year, Glen puts his outfit together and performs a Christmas show using various musicians including:

 David Cowan (ex-Keyboardist with Zal Cleminson’s Sin Dogs.  Also a member of SAHB tribute The SAHB Experience) 
- played with The Outfit from 2013-2016. Currently works with Paul Rose / Band of Friends, Greig Taylor Band, and his own band The Meissner Effect.
 Jon Morrison (Actor/Musician)
 Julian Hutson Saxby (Guitarist with SAHB drummer Ted McKenna’s solo project McKenna’s Gold, Swans in Flight, and Nina Hagen). Band/SAHB/Katy Lied)
 Chris Thomson (Vocalist/Guitarist with Cafe Jacques)
 Stuart Clyde (Keyboardist with Glasgow/Cafe Jacques)
 Davie Halley (RIP) (Drummer with Cafe Jacques). Also played with Glasgow.
 Peter Higgins (Vocalist with Chris Slade's Timeline) 
 Gordon Bell (Solo Artist and Vocalist with Not The Sensational Alex Harvey Band / Giant Stone Eater / The Sinking Ships)
 Johnny Bohran Watson (Bohran)
 Wes Bird (Violinist)

References

External links
 Chris Glen and the Outfit on Myspace
  Chris Glen website

1950 births
Living people
Scottish bass guitarists
Scottish heavy metal bass guitarists
Musicians from Paisley, Renfrewshire
Michael Schenker Group members